Drifters/Love Is the Devil is a double album by Dirty Beaches, released on May 21, 2013. The first eight songs comprise the Drifters set, recorded in Montreal and Berlin and featuring songwriter, instrumentalist and singer Alex Zhang Hungtai, guitarist Shub Roy, electronic musician Bernardino Femminielli, with additional contributions by saxophonist Francesco De Gallo and drummer Jesse Locke. The final eight songs comprise the Love Is The Devil set, recorded by Zhang in Berlin and featuring his instrumental guitar and keyboard work.

The photo for the album cover was shot in the gay bar Roses on Oranienstrasse, Kreuzberg.

Track listing

References

Dirty Beaches albums
2013 albums